Nataliia Mykolaivna Moseichuk (born May 30, 1973) is a Ukrainian journalist, the host of the talk show "Right to Power" on TV channel 1+1, curator of the social project "Right to Education", curator of the School of Superheroes, and curator of the Global Teacher Prize Ukraine.

Biography 
Moseichuk was born on May 30, 1973, in Tejen, Mary Region, Turkmen SSR. Her father was a soldier and her mother a teacher. In 1990, she graduated from high school in Berdychiv, Zhytomyr Oblast. In 1995, she graduated from the Faculty of Foreign Languages of Zhytomyr Pedagogical University.

On February 15, 2022, oligarch Ihor Kolomoiskyi said that if a new presidential candidate appeared in Ukraine, it would be a journalist, such as Moseichuk. Kolomoisky said that he had never discussed this with Moseichuk and was simply thinking of someone who "has one hundred percent recognition." Kolomoisky personally funds the 1+1 TV channel. Moseichuk told Media Detector that Kolomoisky had the right to express his views in the media. Asked whether she might run for president, Moseichuk said: "We have every president, as it was said two and a half years ago."

Personal life 
Moseichuk is married and has two children.

Career 

 1993 — started working as a journalist and presenter on Zhytomyr Regional Television.
 1997 — host of the information and entertainment program "Morning Review" on the TV channel Inter.
 1998 — news anchor on the Utar channel.
 1999 — news anchor of Express-Inform TV company.
 2003 — host of the information service 5 Kanal. Author and host of the program "VIP-woman".
 In August 2006, Moseichuk switched to Channel 1+1 as host of the Television News Service (TSN). She was also the author and host of the project "Hidden Life", about the public and non-public aspects of famous politicians' lives.
 In early October 2016, Moseichuk and Sergei Ivanov became the co-hosts of the talk show "Right to Power".
 In 2017, Moseichuk was the curator of the Global Teacher Prize Ukraine and created the nomination "Choice by heart", which aims to find teachers who have the time, energy and inspiration and teach young patients in medical institutions.
 Moseichuk hosts the main episodes of TNS, broadcast on 1+1 at 19:30.

Charity 
2017 — met with Yuri Sinitsa, who needed a kidney transplant, held a photo shoot with him and joined the fundraising campaign. 60 thousand euros were collected.

On June 1, 2018, during a charity marathon on Children's Day, Moseichuk helped raise UAH 650,000 to open a Superhero School class in the Intensive and Efferent Therapy Department for Acute Intoxication at the Okhmatdyt National Children's Clinic. The money was used for repairs, equipment, and teachers' salaries. Moseichuk is the curator of the School of Superheroes.

Moseichuk told the story of two eight-year-old friends on TSN. Mykyta Fedorenko's friend Luka wanted to help him with a serious illness. He looked for donors among his classmates and organized a fair at the school to raise money. 35,000 euros were collected in a few days after the story on TSN. The operation was successful.

On the talk show "Right to Power", Moseichuk spoke to President Volodymyr Zelensky about the death from COVID-19 of two parents-doctors. She asked to take personal control of the fate of their 13-year-old son, who was on a ventilator at the time, as well as the affairs of all doctors who suffered a disaster during the pandemic.

Opening of classes of the School of Superheroes in the Dnipro 
In August 2020, Moseichuk opened the School of Superheroes Online in the oncology department of the Kherson Children's Regional Clinical Hospital. In December 2020, she opened a School of Superheroes for Children in the hospital KP Dnipropetrovsk Regional Clinical Treatment and Prevention Association "Phthisiology" in Dnipro. This is the second school for young patients in the Dnipropetrovsk Oblast. In March 2021, Moseichuk opened a third class of the School of Superheroes in Okhmatdyt.

There are now eight Superhero Schools in Ukraine: three classes and a library at the Okhmatdyt National Hospital in Kyiv, two in Dnipro, and one each in Zhytomyr and Kherson. A school has also been opened at the cremation center in Kyiv.

Global Teacher Prize Ukraine 
In 2021, Moseichuk awarded two teachers the Global Teacher Prize Ukraine. The first prize was awarded to a teacher who works at the school at the hospital. The second prize, for the first time and together with the charity Vostok-SOS, was awarded to a teacher or volunteer who teaches children at a school in the front line.

Achievement 

 Laureate of the All-Ukrainian Award "Woman of the III Millennium" in the nomination "Rating" (2006).
 Journalist of the Year in the field of electronic media.
 2013 — Teletriumph Award in the category "Leader / host of information program".
 2018 — Teletriumph Award in the category "Leader / host of information program".

Views and assessments 
YuriI Stets, the general producer of 5 Kanal, said of Moseichuk's transition to 1+1: "I know for sure that this is not a desire to earn more and not a desire to actually leave 5 Kanal. She had a dream to work for 1+1 and, in my opinion, this is the reason to look for reasons."

In an interview with Lviv Portal, Moseichuk said that the reason was the dismissal from the channel of several significant figures for her—in particular, the presenter, "teacher and friend" Roman Skripin. She also said that by that time the "honest news channel" had noticeably changed: "It was no longer the news that we did in 2004".

According to FOCUS magazine, Moseichuk is one of Ukraine's 20 most successful TV presenters and one of the country's 100 most influential women. In 2021, she ranked among Ukraine's top 100 successful women, according to the publication New Voice of Ukraine.

In 2017, Moseichuk initiated the Right to Education movement; she works with a team of like-minded people to introduce quality schooling in all children's hospitals.

Criticism 
In 2019, speaking about the Ukrainian language, she stated that she quoted Yevhen Cherniak's post, saying "Business feeds, [the Ukrainian] language does not feed." As it turned out, Yevhen did not write such a thing in the post, which was read live by Moseichuk (including the history of editing the post).

She called the bots of people who criticized her behavior on the program "Right to Power", causing public outcry.

Author of the phrase "War against its own President — war with the state".

References

External links 

 Анкета на сайті телеканалу «1+1»
 «Приховане життя» Наталії Мосейчук — тепер не таємниця
 «Приховане життя» виходить до широкого глядача в програмі Наталі Мосейчук
 Наталія Мосейчук відкрила Першу всеукраїнську конференцію лікарняних вчителів
 Наталія Мосейчук показала фото з лікарні: «треба думати про майбутнє»

Ukrainian television journalists
Ukrainian television presenters
1973 births
Living people